Ursula Fingerlos (born 17 November 1976) is an Austrian snowboarder. She was born in Salzburg. She competed at the 1998 Winter Olympics, in giant slalom.

References

External links 
 

1976 births
Living people
Sportspeople from Salzburg
Austrian female snowboarders
Olympic snowboarders of Austria
Snowboarders at the 1998 Winter Olympics